
Gmina Rytro is a rural gmina (administrative district) in Nowy Sącz County, Lesser Poland Voivodeship, in southern Poland.

Villages
The gmina contains the villages of Obłazy Ryterskie, Roztoka Ryterska, Rytro, Sucha Struga and Życzanów.

Neighbouring gminas
Gmina Rytro is bordered by the town of Szczawnica and by the gminas of Nawojowa, Piwniczna-Zdrój and Stary Sącz.

References
Polish official population figures 2006

Rytro
Nowy Sącz County